شریف آباد در حدود 3 کیلومتری کشکوئیه و 45 کیلومتری شهرستان رفسنجان قرار گرفته است

آب آشامیدنی شریف آباد از معرفیت خاصی برخوردا است .

Sharifabad (also Romanized as Sharīfābād) is a village in Sharifabad Rural District, Koshkuiyeh District, Rafsanjan County, Kerman Province, Iran. At the 2006 census, its population was 2,272, in 554 families.

References 

Populated places in Rafsanjan County